Stefanie Gossweiler (born 4 January 1988) is a model from the Canton of Zürich in Switzerland, who was crowned Miss Earth Switzerland 2007. She competed in the Miss Earth 2007 pageant and finished in the top 8. This is the highest replacement Swiss Beauty in history.

References

External links

Miss Earth Switzerland official website
Miss Earth official website

1988 births
Living people
Miss Earth 2007 contestants
Swiss female models
People from Dielsdorf District
Swiss beauty pageant winners